Pottier is a surname, and may refer to;

 Edmond Pottier (1855–1934), German-born French art historian and archaeologist
 Édouard Pottier (1839–1903), French admiral
 Eugène Edine Pottier (1816–1887), French  revolutionary, anarchist, poet, freemason, and transport worker
 Jean Pottier, French aircraft designer
 Philippe Pottier (1938–1985), Swiss footballer
 René Pottier (1879–1907), French racing cyclist
 Richard Pottier (1906–1994), Austrian-born French film director

See also
 Potier
 Potter (surname)